Thokkukal Kadha Parayunnu is a 1968 Indian Malayalam-language crime thriller film directed by K. S. Sethumadhavan and produced by M. O. Joseph. The film stars Prem Nazir, Sathyan, Sheela and Jayabharathi. The film had musical score by G. Devarajan.

Plot

Cast 
Prem Nazir as Aniyankunju
Sathyan as Raghu
Sheela as Rema
Jayabharathi as Thankam
Muthukulam Raghavan Pillai
Bahadoor
K. P. Ummer as Raju
Mala Aravindan
Nellikode Bhaskaran
Santha Devi as Raghu’s mother

Soundtrack 
The music was composed by G. Devarajan and the lyrics were written by Vayalar Ramavarma.

References

External links 
 

1960s crime thriller films
1960s Malayalam-language films
1968 films
Films directed by K. S. Sethumadhavan
Indian crime thriller films